Amy Stein (born 1970) is an American photographer. Some of her photo series include Stranded and Domesticated. Her work has been shown at the National Academy of Sciences in Washington, D.C.. In 2007 she was one of fifteen "emerging artists" selected by American Photo magazine.

Life and work
Stein studied at the International Centre of Photography and the School of Visual Arts in New York City.

Publications

Publication by Stein
 Domesticated. Photolucida, 2008. .

Publication paired with others
 Tall Poppy Syndrome. Decode, 2012. With Stacy Arezou Mehrfar. .

Publication with contribution by Stein
 Hijacked Vol. 1: Australia and America. San Francisco: Last Gasp, 2008.

Solo exhibitions
Domesticated: Photographs by Amy Stein, National Academy of Sciences, Washington, D.C., May–October 2014.

Awards
2007: One of fifteen "emerging artists" selected by American Photo magazine.

Collections
Stein's work is held in the following permanent collection:
Museum of Contemporary Photography, Chicago, IL: 6 items

References

External links
 

1970 births
Living people
Photographers from Washington, D.C.
School of Visual Arts alumni
American women photographers
21st-century American women